Socket PAC611 is a 611 pin microprocessor socket designed to interface an Intel Itanium 2 processor to the rest of the computer (usually via the motherboard). It provides both an electrical interface as well as physical support. This socket is designed to support a microprocessor module.

Technical specifications
Socket PAC611 was introduced with Intel's second generation Itanium in 2002. It supported bus speeds up to 200 MHz double-pumped.

Socket PAC611 processors reach speeds up to 1.66 GHz.

See also
 List of Intel microprocessors

References

Socket 604